Stanoje Jovanović (born 21 August 1993) is a Serbian footballer who plays as a midfielder for London City.

Career 
Jovanović played in the Premier League of Bosnia and Herzegovina with NK Zvijezda Gradačac in 2014. The following season he played in the Serbian First League with FK Bežanija. In 2017, he returned to the Bosnian top tier to play with NK Metalleghe-BSI. After a season in the Premier League he played with HNK Orašje in the First League of the Federation of Bosnia and Herzegovina. In 2018, he played with league rivals NK TOŠK Tešanj.  

In 2019, he played abroad in the Canadian Academy of Soccer League with London City. In his second season with London he assisted in securing the league title, and finishing as the league's top goal scorer.

References  
 

Living people
1993 births
Serbian footballers
Association football midfielders
NK Zvijezda Gradačac players
FK Bežanija players
NK Metalleghe-BSI players
HNK Orašje players
NK TOŠK Tešanj players
London City players
Premier League of Bosnia and Herzegovina players
Serbian First League players
First League of the Federation of Bosnia and Herzegovina players
Sportspeople from Loznica